Pei Te Hurinui Jones  (9 September 1898 – 7 May 1976) was a Māori political leader, writer, genealogist, and historian. He identified with the Ngāti Maniapoto iwi. As a leader of the Tainui confederation of iwi and of the Kingitanga movement, he participated in negotiations with the New Zealand government seeking compensation for land seizures, served on several boards, and authored a number of works in Māori and English, including the first history of the Tainui people.

Early life
Pei's mother, Pare Te Kōrae was descended from the Ngati Maniapoto iwi. His father, David Lewis, was a Pakeha storekeeper at Poro-o-Tarāo of Jewish descent. They had two sons, Michael Rotohiko Jones ('Mick'), born 1895, and Pei, who was born in Harataunga, Thames/Coromandel, on 9 September 1898. Lewis did not return to New Zealand after the Second Boer War. Pare Te Kōrae remarried to David Jones, of Nga Puhi, and both sons adopted their step-father's surname. They moved to Te Kawakawa, where Pei's maternal grand-uncle (korua), Te Hurinui Te Wano acted as his foster-father "profoundly affecting the rest of his life". Te Hurinui Te Wano died in 1911 and Pare Te Kōrae died in 1915.

Pei was known as 'the child with significant dreams' because he was troubled by night terrors which the tribe believed to have a supernatural element. Two ceremonies were undertaken to cure him of these dreams, which "confirmed a commitment to his traditional Māori heritage.

Pei had very limited formal education. He was enrolled at Wesley Training College in 1913, but attended rarely, and was largely self-taught.

Political career
In 1920, Pei joined the Maori Affairs Department, working first at Whanganui and then as Land Title Consolidation Officer in Auckland. Because he was Maori, he was not allowed to hold any position with financial responsibility, which eventually led him to leave the department.

Pei, along with his brother Michael Rotohiko, and Leslie George Kelly, was involved in the Kingitanga, as an advisor to Te Puea of Turangawaewae, the Maori king Korokī Mahuta and his successor, Queen Te Atairangikaahu. He considered himself senior in his genealogical ties to Te Puea with whom he worked.  Te Puea, referred to Pei and Rotohiko as "those bloody Hurai" (Jews), as their father, Daniel Lewis, was Jewish.

In 1928, the Sim Native Land Confiscation commission recommended that Tainui should be compensated for the land confiscations that followed the invasion of the Waikato in 1863. This initiated a long series of negotiations, in which Pei served as a representative of the Kingitanga, culminating in the Waikato-Maniapoto Maori Claims Settlement Act 1946. Pei served as first chairman of the Tainui Maori Trust Board, established by the Act to receive and administer funds received from the New Zealand government. He was involved with the Maori Land Court, and with the consolidation of Māori land, and with the development of Māori land in the King Country, principally through the establishment in 1945 of the Puketapu Incorporation, which managed logging, timber milling, and sheep farms in the Taumarunui region, on behalf of Maori shareholders. It was sold to the Kauri Timber Company in 1960. Pei was the second president of the New Zealand Māori Council, a board member of the Maniapoto District Maori Council, and the Taumarunui Borough Council.

Jones was a strong National Party advocate.
although a newspaper report said he was "Unofficial Labour" in 1943.

In the 1961 Queen's Birthday Honours, Jones was appointed an Officer of the Order of the British Empire, for services to the Māori people.

Writings
Pei wrote extensively in Māori and English. He wrote the first Māori translations of Shakespeare's The Merchant of Venice, Julius Caesar, and Othello, as well as Edward FitzGerald's Rubaiyat of Omar Khayyam. He completed Ngā Mōteatea, a collection of Māori songs begun by Āpirana Ngata, producing nearly all of the English translations. In English he wrote King Pōtatau, a historical novel on Pōtatau Te Wherowhero, the first Maori king.  He was also a frequent contributor to the Journal of the Polynesian Society and Te Ao Hou / The New World. Pei served as chairman of the Māori Dictionary Revision Committee, which revised Henry Williams' Dictionary of the New Zealand Language (1844, 1852, 1871), and was appointed to the New Zealand Geographic Board for expertise in Māori language and history.

Pei was very invested in the traditions and whakapapa (genealogy) of Tainui and wrote the first history of the Tainui people, in Māori. He began collecting material from oral sources in the late 1920s, publishing Māhinārangi, an account of the construction of the Māhinārangi meeting house at Turangawaewae marae in 1929. By 1936, Pei had produced a manuscript which covered Tainui history from the arrival of the Tainui canoe in New Zealand, until the early nineteenth century. In 1943, when Pei was suffering from cancer and expected to die, he gave the manuscript to Leslie George Kelly to produce a typescript. Kelly subsequently incorporated the material into his 1949 book Tainui: The Story of Hoturoa and his Descendants, without attribution. Pei published a short text in 1950, "Te Korero o Tainui". He drafted a complete manuscript in the 1970s with the assistance of G. H. Rowell. After his death, the manuscript was edited by Bruce Biggs and published as Nga Iwi o Tainui in 1995, with notes and facing English translation. Dame Te Atairangikaahu said "we look upon these words as the living presence of our tupuna (ancestors) and so they are a living taonga for us all." He also published numerous pamphlets regarding the foundations of specific marae.

He was awarded an honorary degree by Waikato University in 1968 to recognise his major contribution to Waikato Tainui literature and development.

Personal life
Pei met his first partner, Hepina Te Miha Teri of Ngati Tuwharetoa, around 1916 and married her in hospital in Hawera on 16 October 1943 while he was suffering from cancer. Hepina died in December 1957 at Whakarewa on Māhia Peninsula. They adopted three children including Brian Hauauru Jones. He married for a second time to Kate Huia Apatari in Palmerston North on 6 January 1958. He died at Taumarunui on 7 May 1976 and is buried at Te Tōkanga-nui-a-noho marae in Te Kuiti next to his foster father, Te Hurinui Te Wano.

References

1898 births
1976 deaths
New Zealand translators
20th-century New Zealand historians
Interpreters
New Zealand Jews
New Zealand genealogists
Ngāti Maniapoto people
New Zealand Māori writers
New Zealand Māori public servants
New Zealand National Party politicians
People from Coromandel Peninsula
Māori politicians
Unsuccessful candidates in the 1963 New Zealand general election
Unsuccessful candidates in the 1960 New Zealand general election
Unsuccessful candidates in the 1957 New Zealand general election
Unsuccessful candidates in the 1931 New Zealand general election
Unsuccessful candidates in the 1938 New Zealand general election
Unsuccessful candidates in the 1943 New Zealand general election
20th-century translators
New Zealand Officers of the Order of the British Empire
People educated at Wesley College, Auckland